The 2006 Chief Financial Officer General election took place on November 7, 2006, to elect the Chief Financial Officer of Florida. The election was won by Alex Sink who took office on January 2, 2007.

Republican primary
Tom Lee, State Senator
Randy Johnson
Milt Bauguess

Results

Democratic primary
Alex Sink, Wife of Bill McBride and Former Bank of America President

Results

Results

External links
Florida Department of State, November 7, 2006 General Election

2006 Florida elections
Florida Chief Financial Officer
Florida Chief Financial Officer elections